Patrick Glen Lane (born March 12, 1975 in Clarksburg, West Virginia) is an American politician and a Republican member of the West Virginia House of Delegates representing District 38 since January 12, 2013. Lane served consecutively from January 2005 until January 2013 in a District 32 seat, and was a candidate for West Virginia Senate in 2002.

Education
Lane earned his BA in political science from Concord College (now Concord University) and his JD from the West Virginia University College of Law.

Elections
2012 Redistricted to District 38, and with incumbent Representative Margaret Smith redistricted to District 46, Lane was unopposed for the May 8, 2012 Republican Primary, winning with 1,273 votes, and won the November 6, 2012 General election with 5,084 votes (64.2%) against Democratic nominee Virginia Moles.
2002 To challenge Senate District 17 incumbent Democratic Senator Brooks McCabe, Lane was unopposed for the 2002 Republican Primary but lost the November 5, 2002 General election to Senator McCabe, who has held the seat since 1999.
2004 When House District 32 incumbent Representative Rusty Webb ran for West Virginia Senate and left a district seat open, Lane placed in the five-way 2004 Republican Primary displacing Representative Renner, and was elected in the six-way three-position November 2, 2004 General election with incumbents Tim Armstead (R) and Ron Walters (R).
2006 Lane and Representatives Armstead and Walters were unopposed for the 2006 Republican Primary and were re-elected in the six-way three-position November 7, 2006 General election against Democratic nominees John Cain, Lucille Chandler, and Jim Francis.
2008 Lane and Representatives Armstead and Walters were unopposed for the May 13, 2008 Republican Primary, where Lane placed third with 2,347 votes (30.9%), and placed third in the six-way three-position November 4, 2008 General election with 8,857 votes (17.6%) behind Representatives Armstead (R) and Walters (R), and ahead of Democratic nominees returning 2006 opponent John Cain, Carmela Ryan-Thompson, and Charles Black.
2010 Lane and Representatives Armstead and Walters were unopposed for the May 11, 2010 Republican Primary, where Lane placed third with 1,578 votes (31.6%), and placed third in the seven-way three-position November 2, 2010 General election with 8,029 votes (20.4%) behind Representatives Armstead (R) and Walters (R) and ahead of Democratic nominees Clint Casto, Philip Lavigne, returning 2008 challenger Charles Black, and Mountain Party candidate Jesse Johnson.

References

External links
Official page at the West Virginia Legislature

Patrick Lane at Ballotpedia
Patrick Lane at OpenSecrets

1975 births
Living people
Concord University alumni
Republican Party members of the West Virginia House of Delegates
Politicians from Clarksburg, West Virginia
People from Cross Lanes, West Virginia
West Virginia University College of Law alumni
West Virginia lawyers
21st-century American politicians